Grabovnica may refer to:
 Grabovnica, Croatia
 Grabovnica, Serbia